Darin Cortland Ruf (born July 28, 1986) is an American professional baseball first baseman, outfielder, and designated hitter for the New York Mets of Major League Baseball (MLB). Ruf was born in Omaha, Nebraska, and played at Westside High School. Subsequently, he attended Creighton University, excelled playing baseball there, and was named the 2007 Missouri Valley Conference (MVC) Player of the Year.

The Philadelphia Phillies drafted him in the 20th round of the 2009 Major League Baseball draft. In the minor leagues, he initially hit for a high batting average, but in 2011 combined that with power numbers to become one of the Phillies' top prospects. In 2012 he led the minor leagues (and the Eastern League) with 38 home runs, and was the Eastern League Most Valuable Player. He made his major league debut in 2012. In 2013, he split time between Triple-A and the major league Phillies. He was embroiled in a roster battle for a bench spot entering 2014, but hurt his oblique, and landed on the disabled list prior to the season. He remained with the Phillies for two more seasons, but by 2016 his time on the major league roster ended. He was traded to the Los Angeles Dodgers, but he did not play in any games before they sold his contract to the Samsung Lions of the KBO League.

Ruf spent three seasons in South Korea, and in 2017 he led the KBO in runs batted in. After two more successful seasons at the plate, he returned stateside and signed with the San Francisco Giants, with whom he earned a major league roster spot.

Early life and career
Ruf was born to parents Bill and Mary Ruf in Omaha, Nebraska; he has four siblings (one of whom is older, the rest younger). He attended Westside High School, where he helped the team win a Nebraska state championship his sophomore season and finish as the runner-up his senior year. He also played football and basketball, and was the captain of the baseball and football teams – during his senior season, he achieved all-state honors in both football and basketball.

After his senior season, he committed to play baseball at Creighton University for its "combination of athletics and academics"; there, he was a "standout" over his four seasons, serving as the squad's first baseman.

In Ruf's freshman season (2006), he started all 52 games. His sophomore season (2007) he was named the Missouri Valley Conference (MVC) Player of the Year, a member of both the first-team all conference squad, and a first-team all-conference scholar athlete. He also was named an all-star for his performance in summer collegiate baseball, during which he was a member of the Wisconsin Woodchucks of the Northwoods League. During his junior season (2008) he compiled a 15-game hitting streak that contributed to his .347 season batting average. After the 2008 season, he played collegiate summer baseball with the Falmouth Commodores of the Cape Cod Baseball League. His collegiate career culminated in 2009, when he was named to the second-team all-MVC team and a third-team academic-All American by ESPN. Overall, he was "all over the Bluejay record books, finishing second in RBI with 201, third in total bases with 423 and in hits with 275, sixth in walks with 135, seventh in doubles with 57 and tied for 10th in home runs with 27 ... (he) started all 227 games in his career." While at Creighton, he earned a degree in finance, compiled a 3.51 grade point average (GPA), and aspired to be a successful businessman.

Professional career

Minor leagues (2009–11)
Ruf was drafted by the Philadelphia Phillies in the 20th round of the 2009 Major League Baseball draft. After the Phillies drafted him, scouting director Marti Wolever asserted that Ruf "is an outstanding defensive first baseman with a chance to hit and has tremendous makeup." After converting to play predominantly in the outfield, however, Ruf's fielding was characterized as either "serviceable" or "weak", and Phillies general manager Rubén Amaro, Jr. commented that he did not have the defensive skills to play every day.

His first professional assignment was the GCL Phillies in 2009; after performing well there, he was promoted to the Williamsport Crosscutters of short season A. With both squads, he held a batting average of over .300. He also participated in the Florida Instructional League.

In 2010, he began the season with the Lakewood BlueClaws, also of Class A, but spent only 32 games there. The Phillies promoted him to the Class A-Advanced Clearwater Threshers, and was the Phillies' minor league player of the week in late May. In total, he amassed nine home runs and 67 runs batted in (RBIs) while posting a .290 amalgamated batting average.

His power emergence began in 2011 when he hit a Florida State League-leading 43 doubles, as well as 17 home runs (8th in the league) and 82 RBIs (4th) and a .308 batting average. Defensively, he played first base, third base, and left field, and even pitched two innings of relief during a 23-inning game. He was named an MiLB.com Organization All Star and a post-season All Star. After the season, he played in the Arizona Fall League for the Scottsdale Scorpions.

Philadelphia Phillies (2012–2016)
Ruf enjoyed great success playing for the Reading Phillies (since renamed the Reading Fightin Phils) in 2012, earning Eastern League Most Valuable Player (MVP) honors, as well as the Paul Owens Award, which is given to the best player in the Phillies' minor league system. During the season, the Fightin Phils sold T-shirts that said "Babe Ruf", a reference to Babe Ruth. He batted .317/.408/.620 and led the Eastern League (and all of minor league baseball) with 38 home runs, 104 RBIs, in on-base percentage, in slugging percentage, and in 1.028 OPS, and tied for the league lead by playing in 139 games and 11 sacrifice flies, while second in runs behind Aaron Hicks (93), third in walks (65), and seventh in doubles (32), all en route to earning a September callup and making his major league debut on September 14 (skipping the Triple-A level entirely). He was named Rookie of the Year, a mid-season All Star, a post-season All Star, an MiLB.com Organization All Star, and a Topps Double-A All Star.

He recorded his first major league hit on September 25, a home run off the Washington Nationals' Ross Detwiler. Ruf totaled three home runs and 10 RBIs in his 12-game "cup of coffee" at the end of the season. An article on Phillies Nation summarized his season and journey through the minor league system: 

Ruf started the 2013 season in Triple-A with the Lehigh Valley IronPigs, but was recalled by the Phillies on July 6 when Ryan Howard was placed on the disabled list. In the minor leagues he was named a Baseball America Double-A All Star. At the major league level, he finished fifth among rookies with 14 home runs, nine of which were in August, the most among any major league player during that stretch. Of his 70 starts at the major league level, 28 were at first base, 27 in right field, and 16 in left field, while of his 78 starts in Triple-A, 59 came in left field and 19 came at first base. Ruf struggled to find a spot on the Phillies roster at which he could contribute, despite strong performance: "Even after proving he can be a productive offensive contributor and showing his defensive versatility, Ruf's spot in the Phils’ lineup may not be locked in for next season." one columnist wrote. For the season, he batted .247/.348/.458.

Entering the 2014 season, he was set to compete for a spot on the bench, as Amaro declared that he was not good enough, particularly defensively, to play every day. However, the Phillies placed him on the disabled list (DL) due to a strained oblique; his estimated recovery time was around the end of April or the beginning of May. When Ruf returned, he played for the IronPigs, but suffered another injury on June 3, fracturing his left wrist when sliding into the wall while playing left field. He returned to the major league Phillies on July 22 when John Mayberry, Jr. landed on the disabled list, but struggled in his first several games; in his first 17 at-bats, he had just two hits. Nevertheless, the Phillies toyed with platooning him with Ryan Howard, who was also struggling, at first base, and Ruf also played two innings at third base. Overall, Ruf amassed only 117 major league plate appearances, batting .235/.310/.402, and was significantly hindered by injuries.

As 2015 began, Ruf once again had to fight for playing time; there was no clear opening for him on the Phillies' roster, notwithstanding the fact that he was one of the few players on the roster with the ability to hit for power. For the season, he batted .235/.300/.414. He had the lowest batting average against right-handers among all MLB hitters (140 or more plate appearances), at .158.

On May 13, 2016, Ruf was optioned to Triple-A to make room on the roster for Tommy Joseph. With Lehigh Valley he was second in the league with 20 home runs, 5th with a .529 slugging percentage, and 7th with 65 RBIs. He was named an MiLB.com Organization All Star. For the season in the major leagues, he batted .205/.236/.337. On November 11, 2016, Ruf was traded to the Los Angeles Dodgers (along with Darnell Sweeney) in exchange for Howie Kendrick.

Samsung Lions (2017–2019)

On February 17, 2017, Ruf's $1.1 million contract with the Dodgers was sold to the Samsung Lions of the KBO League. In his first season in South Korea, Ruf batted .315/.396/.569 and led the KBO League with 124 RBIs while also hitting 38 doubles (5th) and 31 home runs (6th).

He was re-signed for the 2018 season at $1.5 million. In 2018 he batted .330/.419/.605 with 33 home runs (8th) and 125 RBIs (tied for 2nd) and 65 walks (6th) with a 1.024 OPS (3rd).

In 2019 he batted .292/.396/.515 with 35 doubles (4th in the league), 22 home runs (6th),  101 RBIs (5th), and 80 walks (2nd), with a .911 OPS (5th). Ruf became a free agent following the 2019 season.

San Francisco Giants (2020–2022)
On January 23, 2020, Ruf signed a minor league deal with the San Francisco Giants. He made the team's opening day roster. He finished the season batting .276/.370/.517 with 5 home runs and 18 RBIs in 87 at bats over 40 games.

For the 2021 season, the Giants extended Ruf through one-year arbitration on a $1.275 million deal. In the 2021 regular season, he batted .271/.385/.519 with 16 home runs and 43 RBIs in 262 at bats. He played 44 games at first base, 33 games in left field, 5 games in right field, and pitched in one game.

On March 22, 2022, Ruf signed a 2-year, $6.25 million contract with the Giants, avoiding salary arbitration. In a July 21 game against the Los Angeles Dodgers, Ruf hit a game-tying grand slam off of Dodgers reliever Alex Vesia. However, the Giants would ultimately lose the game 6-9.

New York Mets
On August 2, 2022, Ruf was traded to the New York Mets in exchange for J. D. Davis, Carson Seymour, Nick Zwack and Thomas Szapucki. Ruf made his Mets debut on August 5, 2022, entering as a pinch hitter for Tyler Naquin and remaining in left field. On August 15, Ruf made his first pitching appearance for the Mets, throwing two scoreless innings in a loss against the Atlanta Braves, in the process becoming the first regular position player to pitch multiple innings in one game for the Mets.

Player profile
Eric Longenhagen, a baseball analyst for Crashburn Alley, asserted in 2013 that Ruf's ceiling was a platoon player at first base, but that his superior intangibles had allowed him to overachieve in terms of his potential. He wrote,

Offense

Ruf is a strong power hitter who, according to one talent evaluator quoted in Lindy's Sports 2014 baseball preview magazine, possessed "raw country strength" at the plate. He has an uppercut swing, and struggles to hit outside pitches because of poor balance at the plate, but consequently, is able to hit fly balls and drive mistake pitches out of the park. He is a patient hitter, and hits left-handed pitchers better than right-handed pitchers.

Defense
Ruf has played first base as well as both of the corner outfield spots during his career, and focused on the outfield during the latter stages of his development because of Ryan Howard's perceived preeminence at first base. In the outfield, Ruf is a "liability", and he is "pretty shaky" at first base, further underscoring his "man without a position" persona within the Phillies' organization. This has led some to suggest he would be better suited as a designated hitter in the American League. In the 2020 season, which saw the DH introduced to the National League, the Giants used him in this capacity as well as in the field.

Personal life
Ruf's wife is Libby Schuring, whom Ruf married in December 2011. His hobbies include golfing and traveling. During the offseason, he resides in his hometown of Omaha, Nebraska. Christa Ruf, Ruf's sister, also attended Creighton; she played softball there for four seasons.

References

External links

Creighton Blue Jays bio
KBO Stats

1986 births
Living people
Philadelphia Phillies players
San Francisco Giants players
New York Mets players
Samsung Lions players
Creighton Bluejays baseball players
Florida Complex League Phillies players
Williamsport Crosscutters players
Lakewood BlueClaws players
Clearwater Threshers players
Scottsdale Scorpions players
Reading Phillies players
Tiburones de La Guaira players
American expatriate baseball players in Venezuela
Lehigh Valley IronPigs players
Sportspeople from Omaha, Nebraska
Major League Baseball outfielders
Major League Baseball first basemen
KBO League outfielders
American expatriate baseball players in South Korea
Falmouth Commodores players
Wisconsin Woodchucks players